Filip Sveningsson (born July 3, 1999) is a Swedish professional ice hockey player currently playing for Modo Hockey of the HockeyAllsvenskan (Allsv). Sveningsson was drafted in the seventh round, 202nd overall, by the Calgary Flames in the 2017 NHL Entry Draft.

Playing career
Sveningsson made his SHL debut playing for HV71 in December 2016, playing in two games in the 2016–17 season. Showing promising potential, Sveningsson was last draft pick taken by the Calgary Flames in the seventh round, 202nd overall, in the 2017 NHL Entry Draft.

Following the 2017–18 season, Sveningsson left HV71 to sign a two-year contract with second tier club, IK Oskarshamn, on April 19, 2018.

Helping Oskarshamn gain promotion in his first season with the club, Sveningsson made 29 appearances in the SHL with Oskarshamn in the COVID-19 interrupted 2019–20 season. He was loaned to Allsvenskan club, Tingsryds AIF, collecting 4 points through 8 games.

With his contract completed with Oskarshamn, Sveningsson left as a free agent to continue his career in returning to the Allsvenskan with Modo Hockey on 1 April 2020.

Career statistics

Regular season and playoffs

International

References

External links
 

1999 births
Living people
Calgary Flames draft picks
HV71 players
Modo Hockey players
IK Oskarshamn players
Swedish ice hockey left wingers
Tingsryds AIF players
People from Gislaved Municipality
Sportspeople from Jönköping County